Rudenia nigrans is a species of moth of the family Tortricidae. It is found in Baja California Sur, Mexico.

References

Moths described in 1985
Cochylini